Prochoreutis sororculella is a moth of the family Choreutidae. It is found in North America, including California and Ontario.

It is similar to Tebenna onustana, but both the fore- and hindwings are a more chocolate brown and the black spots may be arranged differently.

References

External links
mothphotographersgroup

Prochoreutis